COW / Chill Out, World! is the fourteenth studio album by ambient house group The Orb. The album was released on 14 October 2016 via the Kompakt label.

The album was announced alongside the announcement of a full UK tour taking place between 24 November and 10 December 2016 for their 25th anniversary celebration of their debut album The Orb's Adventures Beyond the Ultraworld after their successful one-off show at the Electric Brixton on 29 July 2016.

Background
COW / Chill Out, World! was recorded and produced in six months. Alex Paterson's recording of sounds using his iPhone whilst touring the world, straight to Ableton, was one of main reasons for its speedy completion. While the duo went out on tour, Paterson collected field recordings for use on the record, allowing for "valuable moments of spontaneous creative laptop productivity" while on the road. Paterson has described the album as their "most ambient album yet", while Thomas Fehlmann commented on how the pair trusted their first instincts and allowed ideas to flow freely. Fehlmann stated:

Track listing

Charts

References

2016 albums
The Orb albums
Kompakt albums